Khökh Chononuud FC is a Mongolian association football club that currently competes in the Mongolian First League.

History
Khökh Chononuud FC was founded in 2019. In its first season of existence, the team finished in fourth position in the Mongolia Second League. The club was runners-up in the 2021/22 Mongolian First League season. They went on to face Khovd FC in a promotion series. Ultimately the club fell 2–4 on aggregate and missed promotion to the Premier League.

Domestic history
Key

References

External links

Football clubs in Mongolia